Lionel Burke Cartwright (born February 10, 1960) is an American country music artist. Between 1988 and 1992, Cartwright charted twelve singles on the Billboard Hot Country Singles & Tracks charts, including a  1 single in 1991's "Leap of Faith". He also charted in the Top 10 on the same chart with "Give Me His Last Chance", "I Watched It All (On My Radio)" and "My Heart is Set on You". Cartwright has also released three studio albums, all on MCA Records.

Biography
Cartwright was born in Gallipolis, Ohio, but was raised in Glen Dale, West Virginia. Cartwright was interested in music from an early age. He first took piano lessons as a child, before going on to master guitar and eight other instruments. Lionel first performed publicly at age ten in community gatherings. He also went on to serve as performer, arranger and musical director on The Nashville Network's musical sitcoms I 40 Paradise and Pickin' at the Paradise.

Later on, Cartwright moved to Nashville, Tennessee and worked as a demo singer. He was eventually spotted by Tony Brown, a producer at MCA Records, while performing in Knoxville, Tennessee. Brown thought that Cartwright needed more experience before being signed to a record deal, and by 1986, Cartwright was signed to MCA.

Cartwright's self-titled debut album was released in 1989 under the production of Tony Brown. Lead-off single "You're Gonna Make Her Mine" charted at No. 45 on the country charts, followed by three straight Top 20 hits: "Like Father, Like Son" at No. 14, "Give Me His Last Chance" at No. 3 and "In My Eyes" at No. 12. Cartwright wrote nine of the album's ten songs, and played guitar, fiddle, piano and mandolin on it.

His next album, I Watched It on the Radio, followed in 1990. It was led off by the No. 8 "I Watched It All (On My Radio)", which he co-wrote with Don Schlitz. After it came the No. 7 "My Heart Is Set on You" and No. 31 "Say It's Not True". The album was also his highest peak on Top Country Albums, at No. 21. Brown produced this album as well.

Chasin' the Sun was the title of his third and final MCA release, which was issued in 1991. Unlike with his first two albums, Cartwright worked with several producers and studio musicians. Although the album produced his only No. 1 country hit in its lead-off single "Leap of Faith", the other two singles were not as successful: "What Kind of Fool" reached No. 24 and "Family Tree" missed the Top 40, with a No. 62 peak. After the latter, he charted two more singles ("Be My Angel" and "Standing on the Promises") which were never included on an album, and left MCA in 1992. He wrote "If That's What You Call Love" on Kathy Mattea's 1997 album Love Travels, a song which also featured him on piano and background vocals.

Since exiting MCA, Cartwright has composed themes for television series, including 30 Minute Meals. By 2013, he had become worship pastor at HopePark Church in Nashville.

Discography

Albums

Singles

Music videos

References

American country singer-songwriters
1960 births
Living people
Country musicians from Ohio
People from Gallipolis, Ohio
MCA Records artists
People from Glen Dale, West Virginia
Country musicians from West Virginia
Singer-songwriters from Ohio
Wheeling University alumni
Singer-songwriters from West Virginia